"How Beautiful You Are" is a song by Japanese musician Ayumi Hamasaki. It was released on February 8, 2012, as the leading digital single from her thirteenth studio album, Party Queen. The song was used at the theme song for the Kyōko Koizumi-starring Fuji Television drama Saigo Kara Nibanme no Koi.

Background 

The single was the second time Hamasaki had released an official single digitally after "Together When..." (2007), the leading song from her album Guilty. It had been three years since a song by Hamasaki had been used as a drama theme song, since "Sunrise (Love Is All)"'s use for Dandy Daddy?.

For the second series of Saigo Kara Nibanme no Koi in 2014, a new song by Hamasaki, "Hello New Me", served as the theme song.

Writing and production 

The music of the song was written by her musical collaborator Tim Wellard, who first worked with Hamasaki on the song "Brillante" from her extended play Five (2011), and also wrote the songs "Party Queen", "The Next Love" and "Eyes, Smoke, Magic" for Party Queen. Fuji Television director Hiroki Wakamatsu commissioned Hamasaki for the drama's theme song, asking her to write a grown-up song. Hamasaki wrote the song's lyrics after reading the drama's script.

Music video 

A music video was produced for the song, directed by Masashi Muto. It features Hamasaki singing in monochrome, and depicts couples of different races and sexual orientations. Japanese gay porn star Koh Masaki and his partner Tien Tien made cameos as one of the couples, a year before Masaki's death in June 2013.

The dress she wore in the video was specially made for her by Indonesian fashion designer Tex Saverio.

Critical reception 

The song received mixed reviews. CDJournal called the song a "beautifully magnificent ballad" that displayed Hamasaki's presence, however felt that the song's arrangement was disappointing. Music reviewer James Hadfield for Time Out Tokyo reacted strongly to the song, describing it as "wretched" and "generic".

Track listing

Chart rankings

Certifications

Personnel

Personnel details were sourced from Party Queens liner notes booklet.Musicians and personnel'

Ian Burdge – strings
Ayumi Hamasaki – lyrics, vocals
Masamichi Imafuku – additional background vocals
Yumi Kawamura – background vocals
Yuta Nakano – arrangement, string arrangement, programming
David Reitzas – additional drum programming, mixing
Timothy Wellard – music, additional background vocals

Release history

References 

2012 songs
2012 singles
Japanese-language songs
Japanese television drama theme songs
Ayumi Hamasaki songs
Songs written by Ayumi Hamasaki
Avex Trax singles
Song recordings produced by Max Matsuura
2010s ballads
LGBT-related songs